New Look, New Sound is an album by the progressive bluegrass band Country Gentlemen, recorded in 1970. After this album, founding member Eddie Adcock left the lineup.

Track listing

 The Sentence
 Where I'm Bound
 To The Rescue
 Roger Young
 Green Green Grass Of Home
 Along The Way
 Let's
 Rambling Boy
 Gentlemen's Concerto
 Take Me Back To The Valley
 Fare Thee Well Cisco
 Preachin' Prayin' Singin'

Personnel
 Charlie Waller - guitar, vocals
 Jimmy Gaudreau - mandolin, vocals
 Eddie Adcock - banjo, vocals
 Ed McGlothlin - electric bass

References

1968 albums
Rebel Records albums
The Country Gentlemen albums